Pellew is a surname, and may refer to:

Caroline Pellew (b. 1882), geneticist
Charles Pellew, 7th Viscount Exmouth (1863-1945), chemistry professor and British peer
Edward Pellew, 1st Viscount Exmouth (1757–1833), British naval officer and admiral
Edward Pellew, 3rd Viscount Exmouth (1811–1876), British peer
Edward Pellew, 4th Viscount Exmouth (1861–1899), British army officer and landowner
Edward Pellew, 5th Viscount Exmouth (1890-1922), British army officer and landowner
Fleetwood Pellew (1789–1861), British naval officer and admiral
Fleetwood John Pellew (1830–1866), son of the 2nd Viscount Pellew and father of the 4th Viscount Pellew
Henry Pellew, 6th Viscount Exmouth (1828–1923), philanthropist and British peer
Israel Pellew (1758–1832), British naval officer and admiral
Mark Pellew (born 1942), British diplomat
Nip Pellew (1893–1981), Australian cricketer
Pownoll Pellew, 2nd Viscount Exmouth (1786–1833), British naval officer and MP

As a middle name
Edward Quinan (1885–1960), full name Edward Pellew Quinan, British army officer
Edward and Fleetwood Pellew Wilson, founders of the shipping line Wilson, Sons
Edward Pellew Wilson, Jr. (1832–1899), British businessman
Godfrey Edward Pellew Arkwright (1864–1944), British musicologist
Henry Pering Pellew Crease (1823–1905), British lawyer, judge, and politician

Other
Sir Edward Pellew Group of Islands, off Australia, named for Edward Pellew, 1st Viscount Exmouth
HMS Pellew, the name of two ships of the Royal Navy and one planned one

Surnames